The 2021 California wildfire season was a series of wildfires that burned across the U.S. state of California. Approximately 3,629 structures were damaged or destroyed by the wildfires, and at least seven firefighters and two civilians were injured.

The wildfire season in California experienced an unusually early start amid an ongoing drought and historically low rainfall and reservoir levels. In January 2021 alone, 297 fires burned  on nonfederal land according to the California Department of Forestry and Fire Protection, which is almost triple the number of fires and more than 20 times the acreage of the five-year average for January. The January fires were exacerbated by unseasonably strong Santa Ana winds, and some of them burned in the same areas as previous fires like the CZU Lightning Complex.

The long term trend is that wildfires in the state are increasing due to climate change in California. The 2021 wildfire season was exceptionally severe in California, although it did not approach the extent of the previous year's wildfire season, which was the largest season in the state's recorded history. As of July 11, more than three times as many acres have burned compared to the previous year through that date, with drought, extreme heat, and reduced snowpack contributing to the severity of the fires. The state also faces an increased risk of post-wildfire landslides.

As of August 18, 2021, the state of California was facing "unprecedented fire conditions" as multiple fires including the Dixie Fire, McFarland Fire, Caldor Fire, and others, raged on. The USDA Forest Service temporarily closed all of California’s national forests at the end of August to mitigate the impact of potential fires.

On October 18, 2021, much of the state—particularly Northern California, where the majority of the significant fires had been located—received its first major precipitation since the start of the wildfire season. This significantly lowered wildfire risk in the region.

Impact

PG&E and other utility companies preemptively spent billions of dollars to reduce the risk of wildfires and avoid an year similar to the previous year's fire season. Firefighters have also set prescribed fires to prevent other fires burning. During evacuations from the Lava Fire, an illegal marijuana farmer was shot and killed by police after brandishing a firearm at authorities, while "defending his farm".

List of wildfires

Wildfires listed by month

See also

 List of California wildfires

References

External links
Current fire information — California Department of Forestry and Fire Protection (CAL FIRE)

 
Effects of climate change
California, 2021
2021